The keping was the currency of Trengganu until 1909 when it was replaced by the Straits dollar. It was subdivided into 10 pitis. Coins were issued in denominations of 1 pitis (tin), 1 keping (copper) and 10 keping (tin).

See also

 Kelantan keping

References 

Obsolete currencies in Malaysian history
History of Terengganu
British Malaya
Modern obsolete currencies
1909 disestablishments in Asia
1900s disestablishments in Southeast Asia